The 2012 Macau Open Grand Prix Gold was the fourteenth grand prix gold and grand prix tournament of the 2012 BWF Grand Prix Gold and Grand Prix. The tournament was held in Macau Forum, Macau from November 27, until December 2, 2012 and had a total purse of $120,000.

Men's singles

Seeds

  Lee Chong Wei (withdrew)
  Kenichi Tago (first round)
  Taufik Hidayat (third round)
  Hu Yun (second round)
  Wong Wing Ki (quarter-final)
  Kashyap Parupalli (first round)
  Dionysius Hayom Rumbaka (third round)
  Tommy Sugiarto (first round)
  Alamsyah Yunus (first round)
  Sourabh Varma (withdrew)
  Vladimir Ivanov (second round)
  Rajah Menuri Venkata Gurusaidutt (semi-final)
  Suppanyu Avihingsanon (second round)
  Andre Kurniawan Tedjono (second round)
  Hsueh Hsuan-yi (first round)
  Ashton Chen Yong Zhao (third round)

Finals

Top half

Section 1

Section 2

Section 3

Section 4

Bottom half

Section 5

Section 6

Section 7

Section 8

Women's singles

Seeds

  Tai Tzu-ying (second round)
  Minatsu Mitani (withdrew)
  Han Li (quarter-final)
  Yip Pui Yin (quarter-final)
  Pai Hsiao-ma (semi-final)
  Chan Tsz Ka (first round)
  Busanan Ongbumrungpan (final)
  Adriyanti Firdasari (second round)

Finals

Top half

Section 1

Section 2

Bottom half

Section 3

Section 4

Men's doubles

Seeds

  Vladimir Ivanov / Ivan Sozonov (final)
  Ricky Karanda Suwardi / Muhammad Ulinnuha (second round)
  Yonathan Suryatama / Hendra Aprida Gunawan (second round)
  Gan Teik Chai / Ong Soon Hock (first round)
  Markis Kido / Alvent Yulianto (semi-final)
  Andrei Adistia / Christopher Rusdianto (first round)
  Markus Fernaldi Gideon / Agripinna Prima Rahmanto Putra (quarter-final)
  Li Gen / Zhang Nan (quarter-final)

Finals

Top half

Section 1

Section 2

Bottom half

Section 3

Section 4

Women's doubles

Seeds

  Eom Hye-won / Jang Ye-na (champion)
  Poon Lok Yan / Tse Ying Suet (first round)
  Greysia Polii / Meiliana Jauhari (first round)
  Pia Zebadiah / Rizki Amelia Pradipta (semi-final)
  Anneke Feinya Agustin / Nitya Krishinda Maheswari (quarter-final)
  Vivian Hoo Kah Mun / Woon Khe Wei (second round)
  Lam Narissapat / Saralee Thoungthongkam (first round)
  Emma Wengberg / Emelie Lennartsson (quarter-final)

Finals

Top half

Section 1

Section 2

Bottom half

Section 3

Section 4

Mixed doubles

Seeds

  Tontowi Ahmad / Lilyana Natsir (champion)
  Sudket Prapakamol / Saralee Thoungthongkam (quarter-final)
  Muhammad Rijal / Debby Susanto (final)
  Danny Bawa Chrisnanta / Vanessa Neo Yu Yan (quarter-final)
  Yoo Yeon-seong / Jang Ye-na (first round)
  Riky Widianto / Richi Puspita Dili (semi-final)
  Phillip Chew / Jamie Subandhi (first round)
  Markis Kido / Pia Zebadiah (first round)

Finals

Top half

Section 1

Section 2

Bottom half

Section 3

Section 4

References

Macau Open Badminton Championships
Macau Open
Macau Open